Éva Sebők-Szalay (26 March 1949 – 4 July 2011) was a Hungarian volleyball player. She competed at the 1972 Summer Olympics, the 1976 Summer Olympics and the 1980 Summer Olympics.

References

External links
 

1949 births
2011 deaths
Hungarian women's volleyball players
Olympic volleyball players of Hungary
Volleyball players at the 1972 Summer Olympics
Volleyball players at the 1976 Summer Olympics
Volleyball players at the 1980 Summer Olympics
Sportspeople from Borsod-Abaúj-Zemplén County